Clementine Paddleford (September 27, 1898 – November 13, 1967) was an American food writer active from the 1920s through the 1960s, writing for several publications, including the New York Herald Tribune, the New York Sun, The New York Telegram, Farm and Fireside, and This Week magazine.  A Kansas native, she lived most of her life in New York City, where she introduced her readers to the global range of food to be found in that city.  Her  1960 book How America Eats was an influential discussion of American cooking and eating habits.

Early life and education
Clementine Paddleford was born on a  farm near Stockdale, Riley County, Kansas, and graduated from Manhattan (Kansas) High School in 1916. She graduated from Kansas State Agricultural College in 1921 with a degree in industrial journalism.  While at Kansas State University, Paddleford met and married engineering student Lloyd D. Zimmerman, separating within a year. In 1932 she underwent surgery for a malignant  growth on her larynx that left her with a tracheotomy tube in her throat, which she covered to speak, concealing it with a black ribbon. The operation left her with a distinctively husky voice. She moved to New York City, where she enrolled in the Columbia School of Journalism and attended night classes at New York University.  She covered expenses by reviewing business books for the business publication Administration and the New York Sun.

Writing career
After a series of writing jobs, Paddleford joined the New York Herald Tribune in 1936. She also wrote for Gourmet.
Paddleford was a pilot, and flew a Piper Cub around the country to report on America's many regional cuisines.  Paddleford coined the term "hero" relating to a submarine sandwich in the 1930s, writing that one needed to be a hero to finish the gigantic Italian sandwich.

Death
Paddleford died of pneumonia on November 13, 1967, in New York City.  She is buried in the Grandview-Mill Creek-Stockdale Cemetery near Riley, Kansas.

Works
Patchwork Quilts, (c. 1928)
A Dickens Christmas Dinner, (1933)
Twelve favorite dishes, with Duncan Hines and Gertrude Lynn (1947)
Recipes from Antoine’s kitchen : the secret riches of the famous century-old restaurant in the French Quarter of New Orleans, (United Newspapers Magazine Corp, 1948)
A Flower for My Mother, (Henry Holt & Co, 1959)
How America Eats, (Charles Scribner's Sons, 1960)
New York Herald Tribune Presents New York, New York, (Dell, 1964)(essay contributor)
Clementine Paddleford's Cook Young Cookbook, (Pocket Books, 1966)
Posthumously collected in:
The Best In American Cooking: recipes collected by Clementine Paddleford, (Charles Scribner's Sons, 1970)
American Food Writing: An Anthology with Classic Recipes, ed. Molly O'Neill (Library of America, 2007)

Notes

References

External links
The New York Times biography of Clementine Paddleford
 "Clementine Paddleford," Kansas Historical Society  
 "Clementine Paddleford: The Badass Lady Pilot Who Revolutionized the Art of Food Writing," by Linda Rodriguez McRobbie, Mental Floss,  Oct. 31, 2015

1898 births
1967 deaths
People from Riley County, Kansas
Kansas State University alumni
American food writers
Writers from Manhattan, Kansas
New York Herald Tribune people
Women food writers
20th-century American non-fiction writers
20th-century American women writers
American women non-fiction writers
Deaths from pneumonia in New York City